Asbury was a station on the Chicago Transit Authority's Niles Center branch, now known as the Yellow Line. The station was located at Asbury Avenue and Brummel Street in Evanston, Illinois. Asbury was situated east of Dodge and west of Ridge. Asbury opened on March 28, 1925, and closed on March 27, 1948, upon the closing of the Niles Center branch.

After the successful reopening of the Oakton station in 2012, it was determined that either the Dodge, Asbury, or Ridge stations could be rebuilt and reopened as well.  It appears the Asbury station has won approval but a timeline has yet to be established.

References

Defunct Chicago "L" stations
Railway stations in the United States opened in 1925
Railway stations closed in 1948
1925 establishments in Illinois
1948 disestablishments in Illinois
Railway stations in Evanston, Illinois